This is a list of National Hockey League (NHL) players who have played at least one game in the NHL from 1917 to present and have a last name that starts with "N".

List updated as of the 2018–19 NHL season.

Na-Nd

 Dmitri Nabokov
 Evgeni Nabokov
 Don Nachbaur
 Ladislav Nagy
 Jim Nahrgang
 Jakub Nakladal
 Evgeny Namestnikov
 Vladislav Namestnikov
 Lou Nanne
 Rich Nantais
 Mark Napier
 Brendon Nash
 Rick Nash
 Riley Nash
 Tyson Nash
 Markus Naslund
 Mats Naslund
 Alain Nasreddine
 Joonas Nattinen
 Ralph Nattrass
 Ric Nattress
 Mike Natyshak
 Gregg Naumenko
 Andrei Nazarov
 Rumun Ndur

Ne

 James Neal
 Patrick Neaton
 Martin Necas
 Victor Nechayev
 Stan Neckar
 Alex Nedeljkovic
 Vaclav Nedomansky
 Andrej Nedorost
 Vaclav Nederost
 Petr Nedved
 Zdenek Nedved
 Mike Needham
 Bob Neely
 Cam Neely
 John Negrin
 Chris Neil
 Jim Neilson
 Brock Nelson
 Casey Nelson
 Gord Nelson
 Jeff Nelson
 Todd Nelson
 Sergei Nemchinov
 Jan Nemecek
 Patrik Nemeth
 Steve Nemeth
 David Nemirovsky
 Greg Nemisz
 Aaron Ness
 Eric Nesterenko
 Nikita Nesterov
 Andrej Nestrasil
 Lance Nethery
 Ray Neufeld
 Michal Neuvirth
 Mike Neville
 Bob Nevin
 John Newberry
 Kris Newbury
 Rick Newell
 Dan Newman
 John Newman
 Cam Newton

Ni

 Scott Nichol
 Bernie Nicholls
 Al Nicholson
 Eddie Nicholson
 Ivan "Hickey" Nicholson
 Neil Nicholson
 Paul Nicholson
 Valeri Nichushkin
 Eric Nickulas
 Graeme Nicolson
 Barry Nieckar
 Rob Niedermayer
 Scott Niedermayer
 Nino Niederreiter
 Jim Niekamp
 Chris Nielsen
 Frans Nielsen
 Markus Niemelainen
 Jeff Nielsen
 Kirk Nielsen
 Antti Niemi
 Antti-Jussi Niemi
 Ville Nieminen
 Kraig Nienhuis
 Matthew Nieto
 Joe Nieuwendyk
 Boo Nieves
 Frank Nighbor
 Frank Nigro
 Janne Niinimaa
 Antero Niittymaki
 Nikita Nikitin
 Andrei Nikolishin
 Sami Niku
 Alexander Nikulin
 Igor Nikulin
 Chris Nilan
 Jim Nill
 Marcus Nilson
 Anders Nilsson
 Jacob Nilsson
 Kent Nilsson
 Robert Nilsson
 Ulf Nilsson
 Cristopher Nilstorp
 Janne Niskala
 Matt Niskanen
 Lou Nistico

No

 Reg Noble
 Andreas Nodl
 Claude Noel
 Stefan Noesen
 Nelson Nogier
 Petteri Nokelainen
 Brandon Nolan
 Jordan Nolan
 Owen Nolan
 Pat Nolan
 Ted Nolan
 Simon Nolet
 Brian Noonan
 Niklas Nordgren
 Robert Nordmark
 Jonas Nordqvist
 Joakim Nordstrom
 Peter Nordstrom
 Maxim Noreau
 Joe Noris
 Mika Noronen
 Fredrik Norrena
 Dwayne Norris
 Jack Norris
 Josh Norris
 Rod Norrish
 Mattias Norstrom
 Lawrence "Baldy" Northcott
 Brad Norton
 Jeff Norton
 Craig Norwich
 Lee Norwood
 Tomas Nosek
 Filip Novak
 Tommy Novak
 Ivan Novoseltsev
 Jiri Novotny
 Milan Novy
 Hank Nowak

Nu-Ny

 Ryan Nugent-Hopkins
 Petteri Nummelin
 Teppo Numminen
 Kai Nurminen
 Pasi Nurminen
 Darnell Nurse
 Markus Nutivaara
 Lawrence Nycholat
 Joakim Nygard
 Mike Nykoluk
 Alexander Nylander
 Michael Nylander
 William Nylander
 Gary Nylund
 Gustav Nyquist
 Bill Nyrop
 Bob Nystrom
 Eric Nystrom

See also
 hockeydb.com NHL Player List - N

Players